A  freedom zone to fire in U.S. military parlance is a fire control measure, used for coordination between adjacent combat units. The definition used in the Vietnam War by U.S. troops may be found in field manual FM 6-20:

A specific designated area into which any weapon system may fire without additional coordination with the establishing headquarters.

World War II 

General Chuck Yeager in his autobiography describes his (and his associates') disapproval of shoot-anything-that-moves low level strafing missions during World War II (although they were not necessarily called "freedom zone to fire" missions). He described his feeling that, had the U.S. lost the war, it might have been considered a criminal activity.

Vietnam War 

Returning veterans, affected civilians and others have said that U.S. Military Assistance Command, Vietnam (MACV), based on the assumption that all friendly forces had been cleared from the area, established a policy designating "freedom zones to fire" as areas in which:
Anyone unidentified is considered an enemy combatant
Soldiers were to shoot anyone moving around after curfew without first making sure that they were hostile.

Gunter Lewy estimated that 1/3 of those killed and counted as "enemy KIA" killed by US/GVN forces were civilians. He estimates around 220,000 civilians were counted as "enemy KIA" in battlefield operations reports during battles against VC/NVA. Lewy estimated the use of freedom zones to fire was an important factor in this. There are no distinctions between enemy KIA and civilian KIA inadvertently killed in the crossfire or through deployment of heavy artillery, aerial bombardment and so-on. Part of this stemmed from the doctrine requirements of producing "enemy body count" during the Vietnam War, which saw violations and statistical manipulations due to ongoing pressures from MACV on units.

Dellums hearings 

Freedom zones to fire were discussed during 1971 ad hoc (i.e. not endorsed by Congress) hearings sponsored by Congressman Ron Dellums (California), organized by Citizens' Commission of Inquiry on US War Crimes (CCI).

Lawrence Wilkerson 

Colonel Lawrence Wilkerson flew helicopters low and slow through Vietnam. He claims to have had vocal disagreements with some of his superiors and members of his own gunner crew over freedom zones to fire, including an incident in which one of his crew shot a wagon that had a little girl inside of it. He describes one incident in which he prevented a war crime by purposely placing his helicopter between a position that was full of civilians and another helicopter that wanted to launch an attack on the position.

See also 
 Rules of engagement
 Area bombing
 Strategic Hamlet Program
 Search and destroy

References

Further reading 
 Lewis M. Simmons, "Free Fire Zones", in Crimes of War: What the Public Should Know, Roy Gutman, Ed, W. W. Norton & Company, July 1999, 

Military terminology
War crimes in Vietnam
Vietnam War